Beeston railway station is a Grade II listed railway station on the Midland Main Line which serves the town of Beeston in Nottinghamshire, England. The station is managed by East Midlands Railway.

Description
Beeston station is on the Midland Main Line,  from London, on the spur towards . The platforms may be accessed either by steps from the Station Road bridge or by short ramps from Station Road for Platform 1 or Technology Drive for Platform 2.

Services

Services at Beeston are provided by East Midlands Railway and CrossCountry, with the former providing most services and managing the station. There are usually 4 trains per hour from each direction.

Facilities

Passenger numbers using the station have risen substantially in recent years, facilities include: a ticket office and ticket vending machines, a café, bicycle racks, car parking and taxi rank.

The Derby-Nottingham section of Route 6 of the National Cycle Network passes by the station and provides a traffic free cycle route to the University of Nottingham.

Network Rail have a long-term aspiration to extend both platforms by up to 69 metres.

East Midlands railway  have a long-term aspiration to provide lifts at Beeston railway station.

History

The station was built in 1839 for the Midland Counties Railway. Services began on 4 June 1839. In 1844 the Midland Counties Railway joined with the North Midland Railway and the Birmingham and Derby Junction Railway to form the Midland Railway.

The first station from Nottingham, at the time it was very popular with people from the city who wished to spend a day in the countryside, desiring "fresh air and recreation".

The original station building, which was little more than a cottage, was replaced in 1847 with the substantially larger white brick building with ashlar trimmings which still exists. This is notable for its carved bargeboards, some remaining diagonal paned windows and the pseudo-heraldic shields with 'MR' and '1847'. The wooden platform canopies and adjacent wrought-iron and glass canopy were installed in 1871. The wooden platform canopies were originally located at Southwell railway station, and were relocated to Beeston when Southwell was rebuilt.

The growth of Beeston led to substantial expansion of the station facilities in the Edwardian period. An extension containing a large booking hall, ladies' waiting room and parcels office was added to the rear of the station building, doubling its floorspace.

In 1937 the Midland Railway drew up plans for an additional waiting room on platform 2 but the plan was never put into action.

Post-WWII

The level crossing, lattice footbridge and signal box survived until 1969 when Beeston and Stapleford Urban District Council built a road bridge ("Station Bridge") across the railway to ease traffic delays caused by the frequent closure of the level crossing. This effectively replaced the footbridge between the two platforms.

With the decline in passenger numbers in the 1980s, the entire station suffered from vandalism and neglect, and British Rail proposed complete demolition. A spirited campaign by the local civic society and rail historians led to the listing of the station building in 1987. A separate listing application was made in the early 1990s and the platform shelters were also listed. This was followed by restoration of what remained of the 1847 building and the platform shelters. The (architecturally undistinguished) extension was demolished, revealing the original gables on the north side of the building.

The original platform masonry survived until 2004 when the platforms were completely rebuilt.

Nottingham remodelling scheme
Between 20 July and 25 August 2013, the services from the station were reduced because of the Nottingham remodelling and resignalling scheme.  It acted as a terminus for trains from London via East Midlands Parkway and from Derby, with a frequent rail-replacement shuttle bus running to and from Nottingham while the western end of the station and approach lines were remodelled.

Beeston station staff

Station Masters

1881 census

The railway employed a large number of local people. The 1881 census for Beeston shows 141 men with railway employment although there is no evidence that they all worked in Beeston.

Miscellaneous

In 1864, John Ashe is listed as the booking clerk.

Leslie Blood worked in the booking office from 1926 to 1939 when he was promoted to the position of Stationmaster at Stoke Golding.

Sir Neil Cossons, now Chairman of English Heritage, worked as a junior porter in his youth.

Station Master's House

 The first station masters house built in 1839 was a small cabin.
 A larger building, originally at Southwell was moved to Beeston and erected in 1857.
 The Station Master's House at 211 Station Road is now private property, used as Station House Children's Day Nursery.

Other information

 The Victoria Hotel public house is adjacent to the Nottingham platform and has its own gate access to the platform, for which it reputedly paid an annual peppercorn rent of 50 pence. The gate was locked out of use for a number of years, so access to the Victoria Hotel was via Technology Drive or Barton St, however it was opened for access again in 2014.
 There was also a Beeston Castle and Tarporley railway station in Cheshire, England, for the villages of Beeston and Tarporley. Between 1840 and 1868 it was called simply "Beeston".

See also
Listed buildings in Beeston, Nottinghamshire

References

External links

 "Picture the Past" Beeston Station c1904
  "Picture the Past" Beeston Station c1910
 "Pictures of Beeston Station taken in 2004"
 See Beeston railway station on Google Street View.

Railway stations in Nottinghamshire
DfT Category D stations
Railway stations in Great Britain opened in 1839
Railway stations served by East Midlands Railway
Railway stations served by CrossCountry
Transport in the Borough of Broxtowe
Grade II listed buildings in Nottinghamshire
Grade II listed railway stations
Former Midland Railway stations
Beeston, Nottinghamshire